This list comprises all players who have participated in at least one match for Pune F.C. since the team's first I-League season in 2009. Players who were on the roster but never played a first team game are not listed.

A
  Krishnan Nair Ajayan
  Mumtaz Akhtar
 Calum Angus
  Ayan Shahi

B
  Nicolau Borges

C
  Caitano Costa

D
  Arup Debnath
  Anthony D'Souza

E
  Anas Edathodika

F
  Raúl Fabiani
  Gabriel Fernandes
  Selwyn Fernandes
  Lester Fernandez
  Edmar Figueira
  Godwin Franco

G
  Dhanpal Ganesh
  Cyd Gray

H
  Thongkhosiem Haokip
  Asim Hassan
  Rollingson Hungyo

I
  Arata Izumi

K
  Nikhil Kadam
  Boima Karpeh
  Mandjou Keita
  Gurjinder Kumar
  Kamaljeet Kumar
  Rahul Kumar
  Sampath Kuttymani

L
  Jeje Lalpekhlua
  Fanai Lalrempuia

M
  Nanjangud Shivananju Manju
  Denechandra Meitei
  Shahinlal Meloly
  James Meyer
  James Moga
  Abhra Mondal
  Riga Mustapha

N
  Balaji Narasimhan
  Daisuke Nishiguchi
  Darko Nikač

P
  Subrata Pal
  Douhou Pierre
  Jayashelan Prasad

R
  Zohmingliana Ralte
  Srikanth Ramu
  Velington Rocha

S
  Paresh Shivalkar
  Amrinder Singh
  Baldeep Singh
  Maninder Singh
  Salam Ranjan Singh
  Subhash Singh

T
  Othallo Tabia
  Lamine Tamba
  Prakash Thorat
  Karma Tsewang

V
  Shanmugam Venkatesh
  Gunashekar Vignesh

W
  Chika Wali
  Jeh Williamson

Z
  Nawab Zeeshan

External links
 Current squad

Pune
 
Association football player non-biographical articles